Rain or Shine may refer to:

 Rain or Shine (film), a 1930 film directed by Frank Capra
 Rain or Shine (Dick Haymes album)
 Rain or Shine (Houston Person album)
 Rain or Shine (O.A.R. album)
 Rain or Shine (Paul Carrack album)
 "Rain or Shine" (song), a 1986 song by Five Star
 Rain or Shine Elasto Painters, a team in the Philippine Basketball Association
 Rain or Shine (TV series), a 2017 South Korean TV series

See also
 "Come Rain or Come Shine", a 1946 popular song
 Rain, Hail or Shine, a 1998 album by The Battlefield Band
 Reign & Shine, a 2005 album by the Mahotella Queens
 Raynor Scheine (born 1942), American actor